Piedmont Hills High School is a comprehensive public four-year high school located in the Berryessa neighborhood of San Jose, California, USA. It is part of the East Side Union High School District and in 2019 was ranked in the highest categories on the California School Dashboard, earning the top rating of "blue" for Mathematics, English Language Arts, and Graduation Rate. In 2003, it was awarded a California Distinguished School recognition and has received various awards in several aspects of its curriculum since. Together with Independence High School and Yerba Buena High School, Piedmont Hills is one of a few schools in the district to have retained its own music program.

The school began operation in 1965, under founding principal Gerald R. Bocciardi.

Recent history

In 2010, the Pirates won the 2010 CCS Division I Championship for football, the first in the school's history.
In 2011, the school's cheerleaders were required to wear sweatpants under their cheerleader skirts while attending classes; the principal considers the miniskirts "too risque" though the rule does not appear during games.
In 2012, the school's concert choir received a Unanimous Superior at the CMEA Festival, the first in the school's history.
In 2012, the school's vocal jazz group, the "Treblemakers", competed in and won the vocal jazz portion of Northern California Jazz Festival for a second consecutive time.
In 2012, the girls' track & field team was the #1 CCS champion. Also became state champions and earned the second fastest time in the country 
In 2013, the Piedmont Hills Drama Department production of "Hairspray" won Best Ensemble at the Stage's Top Honor Awards.
In 2014, the Treblemakers competed in the Santa Cruz Jazz Festival and won a Commanding Performance rating.
In 2014, concert choir received a Unanimous Superior from CMEA, held at Silver Creek High School.
On March 20, 2015, a dead man in his twenties was found at the bottom of the diving pool.
In 2015, Piedmont Hills celebrated its 50th Anniversary with an all-alumni production of A Chorus Line, as well as a Homecoming Reunion.
In 2015, the school's baseball team won the 2015 CCS Division Championship for baseball, the first in the school's history.
In 2018, the school repaired its swimming pool.
In 2019, the school finished its new, modern science building.
In 2020, the school was closed due to the COVID-19 pandemic.
In 2021, the school reopened after closing in 2020 due to the COVID-19 pandemic.

Notable alumni

 Stephen Anderson, American football player for the Houston Texans
 Ato Boldon, Olympic track medalist & World Champion
Lucius Davis (born 1970), basketball player 
 Melissa (Nichols) Dyrdahl, co-founder and CEO of Bring Light, former Senior VP of Adobe Systems Incorporated
 Steve Papin, American football player
Rex Walters, professional basketball player and coach
 Jerry Yang, co-founder of Yahoo!
 Faraz Jaka, professional poker player

AP Courses 
Piedmont Hills offers a variety of AP courses. As of 2023, Piedmont Hills offers these courses:

 AP Calculus AB
 AP Calculus BC
 AP Statistics
 AP Computer Science A
 AP Computer Science Principles
 AP Biology 
 AP Chemistry 
 AP Physics 1/2 
 AP Environmental Science
 AP English Language and Composition
 AP English Literature and Composition
 AP Seminar
 AP World History
 AP US History
 AP Government & AP Microeconomics
 AP European History
 AP Psychology
 AP Chinese
 AP Spanish 
 AP French

See also
Santa Clara County high schools

References

External links
Official website
East Side Union High School District

East Side Union High School District
Educational institutions established in 1965
High schools in San Jose, California
Public high schools in California
1965 establishments in California